An incomplete series of events which occurred in Italy in 1625:

Births
 Giovanni Cassini, astronomer
Pietro Bellotti, painter (d. 1700)
 Federico Cervelli, painter (d. 1700)
 Antonio Busca, painter (d. 1686)

References